"When We Stand Together" is the lead single by the Canadian rock band Nickelback from their seventh studio album, Here and Now.

Release
"When We Stand Together", along with "Bottoms Up" were made free for listening on the band's official website on September 22, 2011. Both songs were released as singles on September 26 and available for download on September 27. The music video was released on November 3, 2011.

"When We Stand Together" was used for the theme song of WWE's Tribute to the Troops. The band also performed this song at the event.

Boxer Lucian Bute came out to the ring with this song before his World Title fight with Carl Froch on May 26, 2012.

Music video
The official video was directed by Justin Francis and made its debut on November 3, 2011, on Big Morning Buzz Live on VH1.

The video was filmed at Malibu State Park. The hill is the same hill from the television show M*A*S*H.

As of November 2020, the music video has more than 115 million views on YouTube.

Chart performance
"When We Stand Together" debuted at number 48 on the Billboard Hot 100. Then, sales picked up and it peaked at number 44. Despite that, the song was a commercial success internationally, peaking at number 10 in their native Canada. It peaked at number 2 in Finland, becoming their biggest hit in the country, beating "How You Remind Me", which peaked at number 18 on the chart. The song also peaked in the top 10 in Poland, Germany, Switzerland, Hungary, and Austria. Overall, the song was a much bigger single than any other from the Dark Horse album.

Track listing
 "When We Stand Together"
 "Bottoms Up"

Personnel
Chad Kroeger – lead vocals, acoustic guitar
Mike Kroeger – bass guitar, backing vocals
Daniel Adair – drums, backing vocals
Ryan Peake – acoustic guitar, backing vocals

Charts

Weekly charts

Year-end charts

Certifications

See also
 List of anti-war songs

References

2011 singles
Nickelback songs
Protest songs
Anti-war songs
Songs written by Chad Kroeger
Songs written by Joey Moi
Song recordings produced by Joey Moi
Songs written by Mike Kroeger
Songs written by Ryan Peake
2011 songs
Roadrunner Records singles